Frances Myrna Kamm is an American philosopher specializing in normative and applied ethics. Kamm is currently the Henry Rutgers University Professor of Philosophy and Distinguished Professor of Philosophy at Rutgers University in New Brunswick, New Jersey. She is also the Littauer Professor of Philosophy and Public Policy Emerita at Harvard University's John F. Kennedy School of Government, as well as Professor Emerita in the Department of Philosophy at New York University.

Biography
Kamm studied at Barnard College, receiving her B.A. in 1969. She completed her doctorate in 1980 at the MIT Department of Linguistics and Philosophy (thesis supervisor Barbara Herman).

She was on the faculty of  New York University during the 1980s to 1990s and received a professorship at Harvard in 2003.

Kamm's early work was concerned with the moral justification of abortion under the assumption of fetal personhood. She is also specifically associated with the trolley problem. Her most recent book, Almost Over: Aging, Dying, Dead (2020), addresses profound issues about death, the meaning of life, and physician-assisted suicide.

Kamm worked as an ethics consultant for the World Health Organization. She is a fellow of the Hastings Center, an independent bioethics research institution in Garrison, New York. She held ACLS, AAUW, and Guggenheim fellowships, and has been a Fellow of the Program in Ethics and the Professions at the Kennedy School, the Center for Human Values at Princeton, and the Center for Advanced Study at Stanford. She is a member of the editorial boards of Philosophy & Public Affairs, Legal Theory, Bioethics, and Utilitas.

In August 2007, Kamm delivered the annual Oslo Lecture in Moral Philosophy. In 2008, she delivered the Uehiro Lectures at Oxford University in England. In 2011, Kamm was elected to the American Academy of Arts and Sciences as an ethics consultant. In 2013, she delivered the Tanner Lectures on Human Values at the University of California, Berkeley.

Kamm teaches the Gamma Cohort of the 2017 Harvard Kennedy School MPP program.

Selected bibliography
 "Abortion: A Philosophical Analysis", Feminist Studies 1.2 (Autumn 1972), 49–64. 
 Problems in the Morality of Killing and Letting Die, doctoral dissertation, MIT, February 1980, hdl.handle.net/1721.1/15975.
 "Killing and Letting Die: Methodological and Substantive Issues", Pacific Philosophical Quarterly 64 (October 1983), 297–312.
 "The Problem of Abortion", in: R. Abelson, M. Friquenon (eds.), Ethics for Modern Life, 2nd ed. (1981).
 "Killing  and  Letting  Die: Methodology and Substance", Pacific Philosophical Quarterly  64 (1983), 297–312.
 "Supererogation and obligation", Journal of Philosophy 82.3 (1985), 118–138.
 "Harming, Not Aiding, and Positive Rights",  Philosophy & Public Affairs 15.1 (1986), 3-32.
 "Harming Some to Save Others", Philosophical Studies 57 (1989), 251–256.
 "Non-consequentialism, the Person as an End-in-Itself, and the Significance of Status", Philosophy & Public Affairs 21 (1992), 381–389.
 Creation and Abortion, 1992.
 Morality, Mortality, Vol. 1: Death and Whom to Save From It, 1993.
 "Abortion and the Value of Life: A Discussion of Life's Dominion", Columbia Law Review  95 (1995), 160–172.
 Morality, Mortality, Vol. 2: Rights, Duties, and Status, 1996.
 "Ethical Issues in Using and Not Using Embryonic Stem Cells",  Stem Cell Reviews 1, Summer 2006.
 "Moral Intuitions, Cognitive Psychology and the Harming/Not Aiding Distinction", Ethics, 1998.
 "Ronald Dworkin's views on abortion and assisted suicide", Journal of Ethics (2004),  218–240.
 Intricate Ethics: Rights, Responsibilities, and Permissible Harm. New York: Oxford University Press, 2006.
 Bioethical Prescriptions: To Create, End, Choose, and Improve Lives (2013)
 The Trolley Problem Mysteries (2015)
 Almost Over: Aging, Dying, Dead (2020, Oxford University Press)

See also
 American philosophy
 Trolley problem
 Philosophical aspects of the abortion debate
 Just war theory

References

Sources
 Unger, Peter, Living High and Letting Die Oxford University Press, 1996. (Unger argues that the intuitions [considered case judgments] on which Kamm relies in her work are, in fact, unreliable. Kamm responds in Intricate Ethics.)
 Kahneman, Daniel, 'Can We Trust Our Intuitions?' in Alex Voorhoeve Conversations on Ethics. Oxford University Press, 2009.  (Kahneman argues that Kamm's case-based method does not give us access to the reasons we have for making intuitive judgments.)
 'In Search of the Deep Structure of Morality.' (A conversation with Frances Kamm) In Alex Voorhoeve, Conversations on Ethics. Oxford University Press, 2009. 978-0-19-921537-9

External links
 Frances Kamm, Faculty of Arts and Sciences faculty page, (accessed 25 September 2007).
 Frances Kamm, John F. Kennedy School of Government faculty page, (accessed 5 December 2007)
 The Harvard Crimson: Harvard Nabs NYU Philosopher, (accessed 10 November 2008)
  Brian Leiter's Summary of Philosophy Faculty Moves and Hirings, 2002-2003, (accessed 29 September 2008)

American women philosophers
American ethicists
20th-century American philosophers
New York University faculty
Harvard Kennedy School faculty
Living people
Hastings Center Fellows
Fellows of the American Academy of Arts and Sciences
Year of birth missing (living people)
Abortion debate
20th-century American women
21st-century American women
Barnard College alumni
Massachusetts Institute of Technology alumni